Ephraim Katzir (– 30 May 2009) was an Israeli biophysicist and Labor Party politician. He was the fourth President of Israel from 1973 until 1978.

Biography
Efraim Katchalski (later Katzir) was the son of Yudel-Gersh (Yehuda) and Tzilya Katchalski, in Kiev, in the Russian Empire (today in Ukraine). In 1925 (several publications cite 1922), he immigrated to Mandatory Palestine with his family to escape Soviet terror by the newly-elected Joseph Stalin and settled in Jerusalem. In 1932, he graduated from Gymnasia Rehavia. A fellow classmate, Shulamit Laskov, remembers him as the "shining star" of the grade level. He was “an especially tall young man, a little pudgy, whose goodness of heart was splashed across his smiling face.” He excelled in all areas, “even in drawing and in gymnastics, where he was no slouch. He was the first in the class in arithmetic, and later on in mathematics. No one came close to him.” 
 
Like his elder brother, Aharon, Katzir was interested in science. He studied botany, zoology, chemistry and bacteriology at the Hebrew University of Jerusalem. In 1938 he received an MSc, and in 1941 he received a PhD degree. In 1939, he graduated from the first Haganah officers course, and became commander of the student unit in the field forces ('Hish). 

He and his brother worked on the development of new methods of warfare. In late 1947, after the outbreak of the 1948 Palestine war, and in anticipation of  the War for Israel’s Independence, Katzir  met the biochemist  David Rittenberg, then working at Columbia University, stating:’ ‘I need germs and poisons for the [impending/ongoing Israeli] war of independence,’ Rittenberg referred the matter to Chaim Weizmann. Weizmann initially dismissed the request, branding Katzir a ‘savage’ and requested his dismissal from the Sieff Scientific Institute in Rehovot, but weeks later he relented, and his dismissal was rescinded. Shortly afterwards, in March 1948, his brother Aharon, who decades later was one of the victims of the Lod Airport Massacre, was appointed director of a research unit, HEMED, in Mandatory Palestine involving biological warfare. A decision to use such material against Palestinians was then taken in early April. In May Ben-Gurion appointed Ephraim to replace his brother as director of HEMED, given his success abroad in procuring biological warfare materials and equipment to produce them.   

Katzir was married to Nina (née Gottlieb), born in Poland, who died in 1986. As an English teacher, Nina developed a unique method for teaching language. As the president's wife, she introduced the custom of inviting children books' authors and their young readers to the President's Residence. She established the Nurit Katzir Jerusalem Theater Center in 1978 in memory of their deceased daughter, Nurit, who died from accidental carbon monoxide exposure and another daughter, Irit, killed herself. They had a son, Meir, and three grandchildren. Katzir died on 30 May 2009 at his home in Rehovot.

Scientific career
After continuing his studies at the Polytechnic Institute of Brooklyn, Columbia University and Harvard University, he returned to Israel and became head of the Department of Biophysics at the Weizmann Institute of Science in Rehovot, an institution he helped to found. In 1966–1968, Katzir was Chief Scientist of the Israel Defense Forces. His initial research centered on simple synthetic protein models, but he also developed a method for binding enzymes, which helped lay the groundwork for what is now called enzyme engineering.

Presidency

In 1973, Golda Meir contacted Katzir at Harvard University, asking him to accept the presidency.  He hebraicized his family name to Katzir, which means 'harvest'.

On 10 March 1973, Katzir was elected by the Knesset to serve as the fourth President of Israel. He received 66 votes to 41 cast in favour of his opponent Ephraim Urbach and he assumed office on 24 May 1973. During his appointment, UN approved resolution 3379 which condemned "Zionism as Racism". He had to involve in the dispute between Mexico (where the resolution was initially promoted during the World Conference on Women, 1975) and the US Jewish community because of a touristic boycott directed from the later to that country. 

In November 1977, he hosted President Anwar Sadat of Egypt in the first ever official visit of an Arab head of state. In 1978, he declined to stand for a second term due to his wife's illness, and was succeeded by Yitzhak Navon. After stepping down as President, he returned to his scientific work.

Awards and recognition
 In 1959, Katzir was awarded the Israel Prize in life sciences.
 In 1966, he was elected to the American Philosophical Society
 In 1966, he was elected to the United States National Academy of Sciences
 In 1972, he was awarded the Sir Hans Krebs Medal of the Federation of European Biochemical Societies
 In 1976, he was elected to the American Philosophical Society
 In 1977, he was elected a Foreign Member of the Royal Society (ForMemRS)
 In 1985, he was awarded the Japan Prize.
 In 2000, the Rashi Foundation established the Katzir Scholarship Program in honor of Katzir, one of the first members of its board of directors.
 He is also a recipient of the Tchernichovsky Prize for exemplary translation.

See also 
 List of Israel Prize recipients

References

External links
My Contributions to Science and Society, Ephraim Katchalski-Katzir
Ephraim Katzir Israel Ministry of Foreign Affairs
PM Netanyahu eulogizes former President Ephraim Katzir
Ephraim Katzir (Katchelsky) (1916–2009)
Ehud Gazit, A vision of a scientific superpower, Ha'aretz, 8 June 2009

1916 births
2009 deaths
Israeli Ashkenazi Jews
Columbia University alumni
Members of the French Academy of Sciences
Foreign Members of the Royal Society
Foreign associates of the National Academy of Sciences
Harvard University alumni
Israel Prize in life sciences recipients who were biophysicists
Israel Prize in life sciences recipients
Israeli biologists
Israeli biophysicists
Israeli Labor Party politicians
Jewish scientists
Members of the Israel Academy of Sciences and Humanities
People from Kiev Governorate
Jews from the Russian Empire
People who emigrated to escape Bolshevism
Presidents of Israel
Soviet emigrants to Mandatory Palestine
Ukrainian Jews
Academic staff of Weizmann Institute of Science
Polytechnic Institute of New York University alumni
Hebrew University of Jerusalem alumni
20th-century biologists
Members of the American Philosophical Society